Birdie is an unincorporated community in Spalding County, in the U.S. state of Georgia.

History
A post office called Birdie was established in 1894, and remained in operation until 1905. Birdie was located inland away from railroads.

References

Unincorporated communities in Spalding County, Georgia
Unincorporated communities in Georgia (U.S. state)